Susanna may refer to:

People
 Susanna (Book of Daniel), a portion of the Book of Daniel and its protagonist
 Susanna (disciple), a disciple of Jesus
 Susanna (given name), a feminine given name (including a list of people with the name)

Film and TV
 Suzanna (film), a 1923 American film directed by F. Richard Jones
 Suzanne (1932 film), a French film directed by Léo Joannon and Raymond Rouleau
 Susanna (1967 film), Hong Kong film directed by Ho Meng Hua
 Suzanne (1980 film), Canadian drama film directed by Robin Spry
 Susanna (2000 film), Indian Malayalam film directed by T. V. Chandran

Music
 Susanna (Stradella), an oratorio by Alessandro Stradella
 Susanna (Handel), an oratorio by George Frideric Handel
 "Susanna" (The Art Company song), English version of their song "Suzanne"

Other
 Susanna - plant genus, currently relegated to Amellus and Felicia
 Susanna, Missouri, a community in the United States

See also
 Susana (disambiguation)
 Suzanne (disambiguation)
 Susanne (disambiguation)
 Suzanna (film), a 1923 American silent film